The Hollow Menwere a British indie band from Leeds, England.  The group named itself after the poem by T. S. Eliot. The members were David Ashmoore on vocals, Choque on guitar, Howard Taylor on bass, Brian E Roberts on guitar and Jonny Cragg on drums. Between 1985 and 1994 The Hollow Men released four albums and several singles.

Starting out as a two piece for the first single "Late Flowering Lust" (featuring session bassist John Dean) David Ashmoore (David Owen) and Choque (who was previously in Leeds band Salvation) were joined by permanent bassist Howard Taylor for debut album Tales Of The Riverbank released on their own Evensong record label.

The trio recorded another album The Man Who Would Be King again on Evensong before drummer Jonny Cragg, who had guested on the album and guitarist Brian E. Roberts, a former bandmate of Taylor's when they were in The Passmore Sisters together, joined.

They signed to Arista Records in 1988 and released their debut single, "White Train", which was a remixed version of the song that originally appeared on The Man Who Would Be King album.  In December 1989, the British music magazine, NME reported that The Hollow Men, along with others such as Carter the Unstoppable Sex Machine and The Charlatans, were their pick as 'stars of tomorrow'. The only album the band recorded for Arista was Cresta released in 1990. The band split up in 1991.

The album Twisted made up from unreleased, demo and live tracks was released in the US only on November Records in 1994.

Discography

Albums

EPs and singles

References

External links
The Hollow Men

British indie rock groups